0.99 may refer to:

 99% (disambiguation)
 99p (disambiguation)
 99 cents (disambiguation)

See also
 0.999...